Gary Simmons (born July 19, 1944) is a Canadian former ice hockey goaltender. He played four seasons in the National Hockey League (NHL) with the California Seals, Cleveland Barons, and Los Angeles Kings between 1974 and 1978.

Simmons was a large, rangy goaltender who had a penchant of roaming far from his goal crease to play the puck or cut off shooting angles. This would often result in either spectacular saves or embarrassing goals allowed into an open net. Simmons' nickname was "the Cobra," and he was known for his distinct black goalie mask that featured a design of a large cobra in raised strike position bearing its fangs. He recorded a shutout in his first NHL game.

Career statistics

Regular season and playoffs

References

External links
 

1944 births
Living people
Calgary Stampeders (ASHL) players
Calgary Stampeders (PrHL) players
California Golden Seals players
Canadian expatriate ice hockey players in the United States
Canadian ice hockey goaltenders
Cleveland Barons (NHL) players
Edmonton Oil Kings (WCHL) players
Ice hockey people from Prince Edward Island
Los Angeles Kings players
Phoenix Roadrunners (WHL) players
Port Huron Flags players
San Diego Gulls (WHL) players
Sportspeople from Charlottetown
Springfield Indians players
Toledo Blades players
Tulsa Oilers (1964–1984) players